Niagara West is a provincial electoral district in south eastern Ontario, Canada.

This riding was created following the creation of the new federal Niagara West riding in the 2012 federal electoral redistribution and includes portions of the former Niagara West—Glanbrook, Niagara Centre and St. Catharines ridings. It elected one member to the Legislative Assembly of Ontario in the 42nd general election.

Members of Provincial Parliament

This riding has elected the following members of the Legislative Assembly of Ontario:

Election results

Sources

Redistribution of Electoral Districts
Niagara West – Proposed Boundaries
Proclamation Declaring the Representation Order to be in Force Effective on the First Dissolution of Parliament that Occurs after May 1, 2014
Map of riding for 2018 election

Ontario provincial electoral districts
Grimsby, Ontario
Politics of St. Catharines